Amparo is a Brazilian municipality in the state of São Paulo. The population is of 72,677 (2020 est.) in an area of 445 km². The city is the seat of the Roman Catholic Diocese of Amparo.

The city is part of the "Water-Circuit", a cluster of towns in São Paulo state which are famous for natural fountains and water wells. One of the main events in the city is the Winter Festival, when some stages are set over the main plaza and presentations are scheduled for the whole month of July. A variety of music bands and artists are invited to the city, from sertanejo (a Brazilian form of country music) and heavy metal to Ballet. Although the event is more dedicated to the city local residents, it attracts tourists from other regions.

Amparo is located about 50 kilometers from Campinas and 120 kilometers from São Paulo.

References

External links

Municipalities in São Paulo (state)